Hatiara High Madrasah is a higher secondary school located near Generator Gali in Hatiara, Kolkata under West Bengal Board of Madrasah Education.

References

Madrasas in West Bengal
High schools and secondary schools in Kolkata
Educational institutions in India with year of establishment missing